The 1974 United States Senate election in Arkansas took place on November 5, 1974. Incumbent Democratic U.S. Senator J. William Fulbright ran for re-election to a sixth term in office, but was defeated in the Democratic primary by Governor of Arkansas Dale Bumpers. Bumpers won the general election easily.

Democratic primary

Candidates
 Dale Bumpers, Governor of Arkansas
 J. William Fulbright, incumbent U.S. Senator since 1945

Results

General election

Campaign
Jones accused Bumpers of excessive spending as governor, citing the construction of a $186 million state office complex. Bumpers not only ignored Jones but instead campaigned mostly for the young Democrat Bill Clinton, who failed to unseat Republican U.S. Representative John Paul Hammerschmidt in Arkansas's 3rd congressional district.

Results

See also 
 1974 United States Senate elections

References

1974
Arkansas
United States Senate